Pribinci is a settlement southeast of the town of Črnomelj in the White Carniola area of southeastern Slovenia. The area is part of the traditional region of Lower Carniola and is now included in the Southeast Slovenia Statistical Region.

References

External links
Pribinci on Geopedia

Populated places in the Municipality of Črnomelj